The Ring of Honor is an award given to prominent players and employees of the professional basketball team, the Phoenix Suns of the National Basketball Association (NBA). Awardees are selected to recognize the significant role the individual has had for the Suns organization (not specifically their prominence in the NBA). While Phoenix retired numbers early in the franchise's history, recent players inducted into the Ring of Honor have their names and numbers displayed at the Suns' home arena, Phoenix Suns Arena, but the numbers could be reused in the future.

The Ring of Honor was opened on April 18, 1999. Tom Chambers was honored that day, joined by Connie Hawkins, Dick Van Arsdale, Alvan Adams, Paul Westphal and Walter Davis, who were moved from the Banners for Retired Numbers section at then-named America West Arena into the new ring. At the time, the Suns' Tom Gugliotta was already wearing No. 24, Chambers' former number. In 2001, Phoenix added Kevin Johnson to the ring while also making an exception and retiring his No. 7, the last number to have been retired by the Suns.

References

External links
 Ring of Honor. Phoenix Suns official website (NBA.com)

Phoenix Suns
National Basketball Association team awards